, better known by the stage name , is a Japanese actress. She is a niece of singer Chiyo Okumura. She married actor  in March 2004, and they had one child. The couple separated less than two years later, and officially divorced in 2008.

Biography
She was born in Osaka Prefecture but grew up in Nagasaki Prefecture. She graduated from Aoyama Gakuin University.

She appeared in Yōjirō Takita's 1986 film Comic Magazine with Yuya Uchida and Beat Takeshi. She also appeared in Lee Sang-il's 2002 film Border Line with Tetsu Sawaki and Ken Mitsuishi. She currently resides in Japan and takes up minor acting roles as well as working as a manager.

Selected filmography

Film
 Aitsu to Lullaby (1983)
 Comic Magazine (1986) 
 Yakuza Tosei no Suteki na Menmen (1988)
 Kachō Kōsaku Shima (1992)
 The Abe Clan (1995)
 Tetto Musashino-sen (1997)
 Detective Riko (1998)
 Yūjō: Friendship (1998)
 Kizuna (1998)
 Detective Riko: Megami no Eien (1988)
 Border Line (2002)
 Last Scene (2002)
 Rockers (2003)
 Survive Style 5+ (2004)
 The Pavillion Salamandre (2006)
 Oh! Oku (2006)
 Koizora (2007)
 Kyō, Koi o Hajimemasu (2012)
 Bokura ga Ita (2012)
 Mugiko-san to (2013)
 Angel Home (2013)
 The Mourner (2015)
 Age Harassment (2015)
 Shippu Rondo (2016)
 Kiseki: Sobito of That Day (2017)
 Nakuna Akaoni (2019)

Television
 Musashibō Benkei (1986), as Shizuka Gozen
 Takeda Shingen (1988), as Nōhime
 Aishiteiru to Itte Kure (1995), as Hikaru Shimada
 Honmamon (2001–2002)
 Journey Under the Midnight Sun (2006)
 Ryūsei no Kizuna (2008)
 Jin (2009)
 General Rouge no Gaisen (2010)
 Shinzanmono (2010)
 The Legend of Yang Guifei (2010)
 Carnation (2011-2012)
 Hana Moyu (2015), as Kaneko Tsuru
 The Emperor's Cook (2015), as Okichi
 Miotsukushi Ryōrichō (2017)
 Hanbun, Aoi (2018)
 The Grand Family (2021), as Yasuko Manpyō

Radio
 Hideki Saijo Raspberry Club (1985-1986) as Assistant MC

References

External links
 Official agency profile 

1963 births
Living people
Japanese actresses
Aoyama Gakuin University alumni
People from Izumisano
People from Nagasaki Prefecture